2016 Pekan Olahraga Nasional is the nineteenth edition of Pekan Olahraga Nasional. It was held in Bandung, West Java in 2016. It was be the first time for Indonesia's third largest city of Bandung to host the games in more than forty years. Bandung hosted the fifth edition of Pekan Olahraga Nasional in 1961.

Bids
West Java was given the rights to host the 2016 Pekan Olahraga Nasional by acclamation of the members of National Sports Committee of Indonesia. Banten was the only other applicant which submitted its bid for the games. North Sulawesi showed its interest in hosting, but later decided to cancel it.

Venues
Events will take place in 68 venues, each venues will be feature in 16 cities and regencies of West Java Province.

Bandung

Bandung Regency

West Bandung Regency

Sumedang Regency

Cimahi

Indramayu Regency

Pangandaran Regency

Cirebon

Subang Regency

Karawang Regency

Sukabumi Regency

Bekasi

Bekasi Regency

Bogor Regency

Ciamis Regency

Tasikmalaya

The Games

Sports
The 2016 edition will feature more sports than the previous edition. 44 sports and 12 demonstration sports will be held in various venues scattered around West Java.

 Aerosport
 
 
 
 
 
 Aquatics
 
 
 
 
 
 
 
 
 Baseball/Softball
 
 
 
 Bodybuilding, Powerlifting, Weightlifting
 
 
 
 
 
 
 

 
 
 
 BMX (2)
 Mountain biking (5)
 Road (6)
 Track (9)
 
 
 Equestrian (10)
 Horse Racing (5)
 
 
 Long distance (6)
 Pool (16)
 Football
 
 
 
 Artistic gymnastics (14)
 Rhythmic gymnastics (6)
 Aerobic gymnastics (3)
 
 
 Field hockey (2)
 Indoor hockey (2)

 Human-powered boat racing
 
 
 
 
 
 
 
 
 
 
 
 
 
 
 
 
 
 
 
 
 Indoor volleyball (2)
 Beach volleyball (2)
 
 
 Freestyle (17)
 Greco-Roman (9)

Demonstration Sports

Participating Provincial Sports Committees

Medal table
A total of 2501 medals—763 gold, 758 silver, and 980 bronze—were awarded to athletes.

Concerns and controversies
The Games were marred with controversies in the competition itself and other non-competition related aspects. At least 15 of the 44 sports contested faced problems involving unfair judging, intimidating supporters, or sudden change of rules. Boycott from other provinces also occurred in judo and synchronized swimming.

References

External links 
  

 
Pekan Olahraga Nasional
2016 in Indonesian sport